Robin Scott Wilson (September 19, 1928September 2013) was an American science fiction author and editor, and President of California State University, Chico from 1980 to 1993.

Life and career
Wilson was born in Columbus, Ohio and earned a BA degree from Ohio State University in 1949, before spending a year in the Merchant Marine.  He then went back to school, obtaining an MA at the University of Illinois.  He served in military intelligence in the United States Navy for several years, before finishing his PhD work at the University of Illinois in 1959.

Wilson worked for the CIA for several years in the 1960s before deciding to devote himself to teaching and writing.  He taught English and writing, and organized the original Clarion Writers Workshop, at Clarion State College, Pennsylvania 1968, followed by instruction at Tulane University, and Michigan State University.  He also wrote several science fiction novels, and served as a consulting editor for the Journal of Higher Education.  He had several short stories published in The Magazine of Fantasy & Science Fiction during the 1990s.    In many of his fiction works, he is credited as "Robin Scott".

In 1980, Wilson was appointed President of California State University, Chico.  In March 1987, the university was named the number one party school in the nation. This prompted Wilson to demand that the local police actively intervene in the parties, shutting them down by force. During the last week in April, police wearing riot gear marched into a crowd of pedestrians in a flying v formation, causing a police riot. The annual observation of Pioneer Days, ordinarily held on the first Saturday in May was suspended. The annual event has since been re-organized.  He also asked the ROTC to leave the campus, after a resolution passed by the school's faculty senate.

Wilson retired from his position with Cal State Chico in 1993, and moved on to California State University, Monterey Bay, where he served as a "trustee professor".

Bibliography

 
"Fair Test", Galaxy, April 1967
"Seconds' Chance", Galaxy, July 1968
"The Grift of the Magellanae", The Magazine of Fantasy & Science Fiction, March 1999
Clarion (editor) (this was a collection of short science fiction which was followed by Clarion 2 and Clarion 3)
Death by Degrees: A Mystery
Paragons: Twelve Master Science Fiction Writers Ply Their Craft  (editor)
Those Who Can: A Science Fiction Reader (editor)
Wondermakers: an anthology of classic science fiction (co-editor)

Sources
Official Cal State, Chico bio page

External links

1928 births
2013 deaths
20th-century American male writers
20th-century American novelists
20th-century American short story writers
American male novelists
American male short story writers
American sailors
American science fiction writers
California State University, Chico
California State University, Monterey Bay faculty
Heads of universities and colleges in the United States
The Magazine of Fantasy & Science Fiction people
Michigan State University faculty
Novelists from Louisiana
Novelists from Michigan
Novelists from Ohio
Tulane University faculty
Writers from Columbus, Ohio